The Ghana Broadcasting Corporation (GBC) was established by law in 1968 with a triple mandate as a State Broadcaster, Public Service Broadcaster, and a Commercial Broadcaster in Ghana. Headquartered in the capital city, Accra, it is funded by grants, broadcasting television commercials and the levying of a television licence, costing 36 cedis and 60 cedis for one or more TV sets in the same house every year. TV set repairers and sales outlets are to pay an annual sum of between 60 cedis to 240 cedis.

History
Established under an act by the British colonial government in 1935, the Gold Coast first operated a Broadcasting outlet called radio ZOY. This was the code name of a relay station the BBC operated. It was in the time of Governor  General Sir Arnold Hodson. It later became the Ghana Broadcasting Corporation after Dr Kwame Nkrumah changed the name Gold Coast to Ghana, upon political independence in 1957. The broadcasting service, originally known as Station ZOY, was introduced on 31 July 1935 by the colonial Governor, Sir Arnold Hodson.

Back in 1965, Dr Kwame Nkrumah inaugurated the television division for black and white screens. Both radio and television became main components of GBC's electronic outlets for information dissemination. In 1996, the Supreme Court settled a key debate in Ghana when its ruling committed the state broadcaster to the equal opportunities doctrine in broadcasting. Thus, the corporation is obliged to be fair and grant equal publicity to all political parties in Ghana. It expanded with time to meet ever increasing expectations occasioned by growth in human population. As a result, the station now operates seven television channels and thirty three radio frequencies which broadcast in twenty five languages.

Establishment
Broadcasting began in Ghana on July 31, 1935, from a wired relay station opened in Accra. The brain behind the introduction of broadcasting into the country was the then Governor of the Gold Coast, Sir Arnold Hodson, affectionately known as the "Sunshine Governor".

He was ably assisted by a British radio engineer, Mr. F.A.W. Byron. By 17:00GMT on that historic day, gramophone records of martial and light music were relayed and at exactly 17:45GMT the voice of Sir Arnold Hodson came through to break the tension and the suspense with this explicit message:

“One of the main reasons for introducing the Relay Service is to bring News, Entertainment and Music into the homes of all and sundry. This will bring to an end the barriers of isolation and ignorance in the path of progress and also to enable the people of Gold Coast to improve on their very rich cultural music".

Administration
The new broadcasting Service, code-named Radio "ZOY", was manned by eight technicians and housed in a small bungalow on 9th Road near the Ridge Police Station in Accra. Broadcasting first began in four Ghanaian languages, namely Fanti, Twi, Ga, Ewe, and later Hausa. Part-time staff were engaged to translate and announce the news in these languages until 1943 when full-time staff were appointed. Between 1946 and 1953, the organisation was administered by the Public Relation Department, now the Information Services Department. The Corporation expanded with time to meet ever increasing expectations occasioned by  growth in human population. As a result, the station now operates seven television channels and thirty-three radio  frequencies which broadcast in twenty five languages.

The Director-Generals of the GBC:

 J. B. Millar 1954-60
 W. F. Coleman 1960–70
 S. B. Mfodwo 1970–72 
 L.W. FiiFi Hesse 1972–75 & 1984–90
 J. Y. Assasie 1975–81
 Kwame Karikari 1982–84
 George Aryee 1991–92
 David Anaglate 1992–95
 Kofi Frimpong 1995–99
 Gilbert Adanusa 1999–2000 (acting)
 Seth Ago-Adjetey 2000–02
 Eva Lokko 2002–05
 Yaw Owusu Addo 2005–07 (acting)
 William Ampem-Darko 2007–10
 Kwabena Sarpong-Anane November 2010–October 2011 (acting)
 Berifi Afari Apenteng November 2011–March 2013
 Albert Don-Chebe May 2013 - May 2016
 Kwame Akuffo Anoff-Ntow November 2016 -January 2018
 Amin Alhassan October 1, 2019–Present

Legislation
On the recommendation of a commission set up in 1953, the Gold Coast Broadcasting Service (GCBS) was established and from there it became a department in its own right. On attainment of independence in 1957, the Gold Coast was renamed Ghana and the GCBS became Ghana Broadcasting System (GBS). The legislation that basically set up GBC as an establishment was National Liberation Council Degree number 226 (NLCD266) of 1968.

Television and radio stations
GBC operates the famous Ghana Television GTV (a channel for events that matter most to Ghanaians), which is broadcast nationwide on analogue terrestrial platform. Additionally, GBC runs four digital networks namely: GTV Sports+ (24-hour sports channel that provides premium sports programmes), GBC News (24-hour news and current affairs channel), GTV Life (Religious and cultural channel), Obonu TV (a channel for the people of Greater Accra and window for the Ga-Dangbe). It has branches or affiliate stations across the regional capitals, partnered with other private and Public Service Broadcasters across the globe, and collaborated with other governments worldwide.

The mandate of GBC requires that it provides services for all segments of the multicultural society, with the cardinal roles being timely information, education and entertainment. It quickly set up the GTV Learning channel to broadcast to school pupils and students forced to stay home as the academic calendar was suspended at onset of the novel Coronavirus pandemic from March 2020. New cards on the table are the plans to establish radio stations in the six newly created regions in Ghana.

Regional FM stations nationwide:
Uniiq FM  
Volta Star  
Twin City Radio  
Radio Central
Radio Savannah  
Garden City Radio 
URA Radio
Radio Upper West
Sunrise FM
Obonu FM
Radio BAR

Training school
The Ghana Broadcasting Corporation, which is also an agency overseen by the Ministry of Information, runs a training school that provides tuition in radio and TV broadcasting and engineering. It has over the years trained both locally and internationally renowned broadcasters. The training school has two faculties: Broadcast Journalism and Broadcast Technology. The corporation also promotes training and educational programs and is central to fulfilling the GBC's mission to inform, educate and entertain.

Landmarks

References

Further reading

External links
Official site of Ghana Broadcasting Corporation - GBC

Broadcasting in Ghana
Mass media companies of Ghana
Mass media in Accra
Publicly funded broadcasters
Radio stations in Ghana
State media
Mass media companies established in 1935
1935 establishments in Gold Coast (British colony)
British companies established in 1935